Government Higher Secondary School Irikkur, Kerala, India, was started in 1957. The school is situated on a mountain about one kilometer away from Irikkur town. The river Irikkur is nearby. The people residing in and around Irikkur are very poor. Mamanam Temple and Nilamuttam Makham are two religious centers near to school.

There are eight buildings for the school. Six of them are permanent buildings and two are semi-permanent The higher secondary wing works in the old block. School office, lab, library, higher secondary lab etc.works in the main block. It is a two storied building, close to the Irikkur-Blathur road. Other buildings are occupied by classes. In the higher secondary there are science and humanities batches. In high school section there are 22 divisions. In primary section there are five divisions.

History
GHSS Irikkur is situated near the Irikkur River. The river is the geographical border of the old Kottayam taluk and Chirakkal taluk. The people residing both side of the river mingled together and the cooperation resulted in the formation of Irikkur village. The name "Irikkur" was considered to be formed from the Malayalam word 'iru kara ooru' which means a village of both side of the river.

The high school was started in 1957. The school was recognized by the Malabar District Board, but as there was no building for the school, the admission was using one room in Kamaliya Madrasa UP School. A thatched building was the first building made for the school. Through the Malabar district Board president was P.T.Bhaskarapaniker, the school was inaugurated by the Vice President K.V Moosankuttyi. In  1957 the Ninth standard was started. The Tenth standard was started in 1958 and Eleventh in 1959. The first SSLC batch appeared for the exam in March 1960. Of the 27 students, seven passed the exam. The center of exam was Koodali High school.

The first headmaster of the school was John Master. As he was transferred Abdullah, E.K. Lakshminarayana Sastrikal respectively took charge. T.Subbayya Chettiyar was the headmaster when the first batch of students appeared for the SSLC exam.

The first building for the school was inaugurated by the district collector Sri. Chandra Banu IAS. The second building was inaugurated by the then education minister C.H. Muhammed Koya. The number of students in the school gradually increased and the school began a shift system.

References

External links
Official website
schoolwiki

High schools and secondary schools in Kerala
Schools in Kannur district
Educational institutions established in 1957
1957 establishments in Kerala